Manuel Fischer (born 19 September 1989) is a German retired footballer who played as a striker.

Career
Fischer began his career with VfB Stuttgart. He appeared for the club's reserve side in the Regionalliga Süd.

He made his professional debut on 12 December 2007 against FC Barcelona in the UEFA Champions League.

Fischer set a record for the greatest number of goals scored in an international under-17 season in 2005–06 with a total of 13.

The then 19-year-old scored his first Bundesliga goal on 17 May 2008 in the last game of the 2007–08 season.

On 4 July 2008, he extended his contract until the summer of 2011.

On 6 January 2009, Fischer was loaned out to TuS Koblenz until the end of the season.

In July 2010, he was loaned out to SV Wacker Burghausen until the end of the season, but the loan was terminated because of a knee injury after six months.

After his medical rehabilitation Fischer kept himself fit on loan at the second team of 1. FC Heidenheim 1846 until the summer of 2011. He left Stuttgart in summer 2011 to sign for Bayern Munich II, where he spent a year before signing for SpVgg Unterhaching. Half a season later he signed for fourth tier Regionalliga Südwest club SG Sonnenhof Großaspach, helping them to achieve promotion to 3. Liga in 2014.

In January 2015, he transferred to fellow 3. Liga side Stuttgarter Kickers, signing a contract until 2016.

Personal life
His brother Sebastian currently plays football for SSV Ulm 1846.

References

External links
 
 Performance data at dfb.de
 Manuel Fischer at Kicker

1989 births
Living people
People from Aalen
Sportspeople from Stuttgart (region)
Footballers from Baden-Württemberg
German footballers
Germany youth international footballers
VfB Stuttgart players
VfB Stuttgart II players
TuS Koblenz players
SV Wacker Burghausen players
SSV Ulm 1846 players
1. FC Heidenheim players
FC Bayern Munich II players
SpVgg Unterhaching players
SG Sonnenhof Großaspach players
Stuttgarter Kickers players
FC 08 Homburg players
SSV Reutlingen 05 players
Bundesliga players
2. Bundesliga players
3. Liga players
Regionalliga players
Association football forwards